Leonora Airport  is an airport in Leonora, Western Australia. The airport is located along the western side of the townsite, with the terminal  from the central business area. A new passenger terminal was constructed in 1997.

The airport received $161,617 in funds for security upgrades in 2005. Its status was raised in 2009.

Airlines and destinations

See also
 List of airports in Western Australia
 Aviation transport in Australia

References

External links

Leonora Airport
 Airservices Aerodromes & Procedure Charts

Airports in Western Australia
Shire of Leonora